Gallot is a surname. Notable people with the surname include:

 Jacques Gallot ( 1625– 1695), French lutenist and composer
 Rick Gallot (born 1966), American politician
 Sylvestre Gallot (born 1948), French mathematician